This is a complete list of members of the United States House of Representatives during the 12th United States Congress listed by seniority. For the most part, representatives are ranked by the beginning of their terms in office.

As an historical article, the districts and party affiliations listed reflect those during the 12th Congress (March 4, 1811 – March 3, 1813). Seats and party affiliations on similar lists for other Congresses will be different for certain members.

This article describes the criteria for seniority in the House of Representatives and sets out the list of members by seniority. It is prepared on the basis of the interpretation of seniority applied to the House of Representatives in the current congress. In the absence of information to the contrary, it is presumed that the twenty-first-century practice is identical to the seniority customs used during the 12th Congress.

House seniority
Seniority in the House, for Congressmen with unbroken service, depends on the date on which the members first term began. That date is either the start of the Congress (4 March in odd numbered years, for the era up to and including the 73rd Congress starting in 1933) or the date of a special election during the Congress. Since many members start serving on the same day as others, ranking between them is based on alphabetical order by the last name of the congressman.

Congressmen, in early Congresses, were often elected after the legal start of the Congress. Such representatives are attributed with unbroken seniority, from the legal start of the congressional term, if they were the first person elected to a seat in a Congress. The date of the election is indicated in a note.

The seniority date is normally taken from the members entry in the Biographical Directory of the United States Congress, except where the date given is the legal start of the Congress and the actual election (for someone who was not the first person elected to the seat in that Congress) was later. The date of election is taken from United States Congressional Elections 1788-1997. In a few instances the latter work provides dates, for the start and end of terms, which correct those in the Biographical Directory. 

The Biographical Directory normally uses the date of a special election, as the seniority date.  However, mostly in early Congresses, the date of the member taking his seat can be the one given. The date of the special election is mentioned in a note to the list below, when that date is not used as the seniority date by the Biographical Directory. 

Representatives who returned to the House, after having previously served, are credited with service equal to one less than the total number of terms they served. When a representative has served a prior term of less than two terms (i.e. prior term minus one equals less than one), he is ranked above all others whose service begins on the same day.

Leadership
In this Congress the only formal leader was the Speaker of the House. A Speakership ballot was held on November 4, 1811, and Henry Clay (DR-KY) was elected.

The title Dean of the House (sometimes known, in the nineteenth century, as Father of the House) was held by the member with the longest continuous service. It was not a leadership position.

Standing committees
The House created its first standing committee, on April 13, 1789. There were nine standing committees, listed in the rules initially used by the 12th Congress.

Committees, in this period, were appointed for a session at a time by the Speaker.

This list refers to the standing committees of the House in the 12th Congress, the year of establishment as a standing committee, the number of members assigned to the committee and the dates of appointment in each session, the end of the session and its chairman. Chairmen, who were re-appointed after serving in the previous Congress, are indicated by an *.

The first session was November 4, 1811-July 6, 1812 (245 days) and the second session was November 2, 1812-March 3, 1813 (122 days).

List of representatives by seniority
A numerical rank is assigned to each of the 142 members initially elected to the 12th Congress. Other members, who were not the first person elected to a seat but who joined the House during the Congress, are not assigned a number (with the exception of the first member from the newly admitted state of Louisiana, who is numbered 143). 

Four Representatives-elect were not sworn in, as they resigned. The list below includes the Representatives-elect (with name in italics), with the seniority they would have held if sworn in.

Party designations used in this article are DR for Democratic-Republican members and F for Federalist representatives. Designations used for service in the first three congresses are (A) for Anti-Administration members and (P) for Pro-Administration representatives.

See also
12th United States Congress
List of United States congressional districts
List of United States senators in the 12th Congress by seniority

References

 United States Congressional Elections 1788-1997, by Michael J. Dubin (McFarland and Company 1998)

External links
House Journal, First Forty-three Sessions of Congress
House of Representatives list of members of the 12th Congress

12
12th United States Congress